James Moroney (born March 19, 1953) is an American rower. He competed at the 1972 Summer Olympics and the 1976 Summer Olympics.

References

External links
 

1953 births
Living people
American male rowers
Olympic rowers of the United States
Rowers at the 1972 Summer Olympics
Rowers at the 1976 Summer Olympics
Rowers from Philadelphia
Pan American Games medalists in rowing
Pan American Games gold medalists for the United States
Rowers at the 1975 Pan American Games